Tjibbe Veldkamp (born 19 October 1962) is a Dutch author of children's books.

Veldkamp was born in Groningen and studied psychology at the University of Groningen. He became a scientist In 1988 someone suggested him to write children's books. In 1990 he turned to writing children's books; his first book, Een ober van niks, was published in 1992. He made this in collaboration with illustrator Philip Hopman. He also works with illustrator Kees De Boer.

Since then, he combines writing books with writing for the Dutch Donald Duck magazine. Since 2001 he has been a full-time writer and translator.

In 2009 he was awarded a Silver Griffel for Tiffany Dop, and in 2010 he was asked to produce the 2011 Kinderboekenweekgeschenk.

In 2012, he translated Dav Pilkey's Captain Underpants series into Dutch.

Currently Tjibbe Veldkamp lives in Groningen.

See also
 List of publications during the Boekenweek

References

1962 births
Living people
Dutch children's writers
People from Groningen (city)
University of Groningen alumni